Tony Manero may refer to:

Tony Manero (golfer) (1905–1989), American golfer
Tony Manero (film), 2008 Chilean film
Anthony "Tony" Manero, character played by John Travolta in the films Saturday Night Fever and Staying Alive